The Newtsuit is an atmospheric diving suit designed and originally built by Phil Nuytten.

The suit is used for work on ocean drilling rigs, pipelines, salvage jobs, and photographic surveys, and is standard equipment in many of the world's navies.

This aluminum hard suit has fully articulated, rotary joints in the arms and legs that give the pilot a great range of mobility. These joints operate freely at high pressures. At the time the suit was constructed, it was the first of its kind in this regard. The pilot can control objects and handle tools with manipulator jaws at the ends of the arms.

The suit can be operated untethered, with a thruster pack that can be fitted to the suit. This allows mobility in mid-water. The Newtsuit navigates with foot controls. The left foot provides vertical control, with the right foot providing lateral control. Other equipment that can be attached includes twin video cameras, colour imaging sonar, and an AMS suit monitor system that transmits information to the surface, such as CO2, HPO (high pressure oxygen), O2%, depth, temperature, and cabin pressure.

Communication is achieved through digital voice/data transmission via water and umbilical cable.

Specifications
 Length: 162 – 193 cm (5'4" – 6’4")
 Beam: 76 cm (30")
 Weight: 
 Weight in water: -2 to -4 kg ( - 4 to -8 lbs) flying mode
 Hull: A356 cast aluminum
 Propulsion: two thruster packs (constant with variable pitch)
 Operational depth: 305 m (1000 ft) (tested to )
 Power: two electric 2.25 hp (at 400 Hz) electric motors, supplied by an umbilical cord to the surface ship, 5 hour emergency supply from battery
 Life support: closed circuit rebreather, (up to 48 hours) with fan powered CO2 scrubber, and a back-up emergency rebreather circulated by breathing.

Emergency equipment
In the event of an emergency, the suit is equipped with the following:
 Tether cutter
 37.5 kHz pinger
 Ballast jettison
 Xenon strobe
 Radio frequency beacon

Exosuit
The newest generation of this type of suit is called the Exosuit, also designed by Phil Nuytten.

References

External links
 Image and specifications of the Exosuit
 Images of other hard, atmospheric diving suit, including the WASP series
 
 Image of Canadian astronaut Julie Payette in Newtsuit

Environmental suits
Diving environmental protection equipment
Underwater work